Alfred Gudeman (August 26, 18629 September 1942) was an American-German classical scholar.

Biography
He was born in Atlanta, Georgia and graduated from Columbia University in 1883 and studied under Johannes Vahlen and Hermann Diels at the University of Berlin. From 1890 to 1893 he was reader in classical philology at Johns Hopkins University, from 1893 to 1902 professor in the University of Pennsylvania, and from 1902 to 1904 professor in Cornell University.

He wrote Latin Literature of the Empire (2 vols., Prose and Poetry, 1898–1899), a History of Classical Philology (1902) and Sources of Plutarchs Life of Cicero (1902); and edited Tacitus' Dialogus de oratoribus (text with commentary, 1894 and 1898) and Agricola (1899; with Germania, 1900), and Sallust's Catiline (1903).
In 1904 he became a member of the corps of scholars preparing the Thesaurus Linguae Latinae, a unique distinction for an American Latinist, as was the publication of his critical edition, with German commentary, of Tacitus' Agricola in 1902 by the Weidmannsche Buchhandlung of Berlin.

Gudeman married a German woman and, in 1917, received German nationality. Even after the seizure of power by the National Socialists, Gudeman remained in Germany. His son Theodore emigrated to Indiana in 1937, but Gudeman himself remained. He was classified as a Jew and deported to the Nazi Theresienstadt concentration camp, where he died in 1942.

References

Sources 
 Donna Hurley, "Alfred Gudeman, Atlanta, Georgia, 1862-Theresienstadt, 1942", TAPA 120 (1990) pp. 355–381

External links 

 
Alfred Gudeman's Imagines Philologorum, 2nd Edition

American classical scholars
Columbia University alumni
German people who died in the Theresienstadt Ghetto
American expatriates in Germany
American Jews
1862 births
1942 deaths
Writers from Atlanta
Classical scholars of Johns Hopkins University
Classical scholars of Cornell University
Classical scholars of the University of Pennsylvania
Scholars of Latin literature
American people who died in Nazi concentration camps